A list of Bangladeshi films released in 1981.

Releases

See also

1981 in Bangladesh

References

Film
Bangladesh
 1981